Internet Explorer Developer Tools, also known as the F12 Developer Tools in Windows 10, and formerly known as Internet Explorer Developer Toolbar, is a web development tool built into Microsoft Internet Explorer and Microsoft Edge that aids in design and debugging of web pages. 

It was introduced as a toolbar for Internet Explorer 6 and 7. Internet Explorer 8 and later have developer tools built in. It allows validating of CSS and HTML, previewing page layout at various resolutions, and also offers a ruler (measuring in pixels) to aid in positioning the elements. It allows viewing the source of the entire page, color-coded for ease of navigation, or selected elements of it, as well as view the DOM source and the CSS selectors that are applied to the element. It also enables viewing the properties and styles of individual elements and also trace styles of elements to its declaration.

The toolbar includes a toggleable pane at the bottom of the window. The pane shows the structure of the web page; and for each structure, the properties and styles. It exposes its features through a menu hierarchy, and includes toolbar buttons for quick access to features such as clearing the browser cache and enabling the selecting of elements by clicking in the rendered page, rather than navigating through the visual representation of the DOM tree.

See also
 Firebug (software)
 Web Developer (software)
 DOM Inspector
 Opera Dragonfly

References

Internet Explorer add-ons
Internet Explorer
2007 software